Mordellistena abaceta is a species of beetle in the genus Mordellistena of the family Mordellidae. It was discovered in 1917.

References

abaceta
Beetles described in 1917